Balbura or Balboura was a town of ancient Lycia, the site of which is at Çölkayiği. The acropolis hill is about 90 metres above the plain of Katara.

The site was discovered by Hoskyn and Forbes.

The Site

The ruins occupy a considerable space on two hills on both sides of a stream.

The city wall still stands on the northern hill up to 2.4 m high, with a stretch of polygonal masonry 1.8 m thick.

There are two theatres; one is on the south side of the acropolis hill, and the other is in a hollow which formed the cavea, in the front of the mountain on the south side of the stream. The former is of unusual construction as the cavea is interrupted in the centre by a large block of natural rock with the ends of the rows of seats attached.

A triple-arched gate is dedicated to Septimius Severus and Geta.

There are also remains of several temples and of Christian churches.

History

Balbura was a member of a tetrapolis headed by Kibyra, formed in the 2nd c. BC and dissolved 82 BC, after which it was attached to the Lycian League.

Balbura was part of a district called Cabalia, named Cabalis by Strabo with two other cities, Bubon and Oenoanda.

The ethnic name Βαλβουρεύς occurs on two inscriptions at least at Katara.

Balbura minted coins during the Hellenistic Age and during the reign of Caligula.

Bishopric 

Balbura was a bishopric early, a suffragan of the metropolitan see of Myra, the capital of the Roman province of Lycia. The names of four of its bishops are recorded in extant documents. Hermaeus was at the First Council of Constantinople in 381. Philippus took part the Council of Chalcedon in 351. Nicolaus was a signatory of the protest letter that the bishops of the province of Lycia sent in 458 to Byzantine Emperor Leo I the Thracian over the killing of Proterius of Alexandria. Ioannes was a participant in the Photian Council of Constantinople (879).

No longer a residential bishopric, Balbura is today listed by the Catholic Church as a titular see.

References

Further reading
 C. Naour: Nouvelles inscriptions de Balboura. In: Ancient Society 9 (1978) 165–185.
 Kent J. Rigsby An imperial letter at Balbura. In: American Journal of Philology 100 (1979) 401–407.
 J. J. Coulton, N. P. Milner, A. T. Reyes: Balboura survey. Onesimos and Meleager. Part 1. In: Anatolian Studies 38 (1988) 121–145. Part 2: In: Anatolian Studies 39 (1989) 41–62.
 Lionel Bier: The lower theatre at Balboura. In: Anatolian Studies 40 (1990) 69-79
 A. S. Hall, J. J. Coulton: A Hellenistic allotment list from Balboura in the Kibyratis. In: Chiron 20 (1990) 109–153.
 D. K. Money: Lions of the mountains. The sarcophagi of Balboura. In: Anatolian Studies 40 (1990) 29–54.
 N. P. Milner: Victors in the Meleagria and the Balbouran élite. In: Anatolian Studies 41 (1991) 23–62.
 C. H. Hallett, J. J. Coulton: The east tomb and other tomb buildings at Balboura. In: Anatolian Studies 43 (1993) 41–68.
 Lionel Bier: The upper theatre at Balboura. In: Anatolian Studies 44 (1994) 27–46.
 J. J. Coulton: The fortifications of Balboura. In: Revue des études anciennes 96 (1994) 329–335.
 Tyler Jo Smith: The Votive Reliefs from Balboura and its Environs, In: Anatolian Studies (1997) 3-49.
 Hansgerd Hellenkemper, Friedrich Hild: Lykien und Pamphylien, Tabula Imperii Byzantini 8. Wien 2004, S. 477–479.

External links
archaeological sketches of the theaters at Balbura
pictures of the site

Populated places in ancient Lycia
Catholic titular sees in Asia
Ancient Greek archaeological sites in Turkey
Former populated places in Turkey
Buildings and structures in Burdur Province
History of Burdur Province
Archaeological sites in the Mediterranean Region, Turkey
Geography of Burdur Province
Tourist attractions in Burdur Province